Alexander Young (20 October 1925 – 2 March 2010) was a Scottish footballer and coach.  He played at centre-half for the league-winning Aberdeen team of 1954–55, and was inducted into the Aberdeen FC "Hall of Fame" as one of the founding members in 2003.

Playing career

Young began his playing career in junior football in the West of Scotland, playing for Kilsyth Rangers and Blantyre Victoria – with whom he won a Scottish Junior Cup in 1950 – before signing for Aberdeen at the relatively late age of 24. He was a mainstay of the successful Aberdeen side of the 1950s, playing in every game of the league championship season in 1954–55, and appearing in two Scottish Cup finals, in 1953 and 1954. In the second of these finals, Young scored an own goal to open the scoring for Celtic, who went on to win 2–1.

Young never played for the Scottish national team, despite being a highly regarded defender, and having captained the junior international side. Archie Glen, one of Young's teammates in the league-winning side, considered him to be one of that side's more under-rated players: 

Young left Aberdeen in 1958, moving to Ross County, then in the Highland League, where he served as player-coach until retiring on medical advice in 1964.

He went on to run a grocery shop in Fortrose.

References

1925 births
2010 deaths
Footballers from Glasgow
Association football central defenders
Scottish footballers
Aberdeen F.C. players
Ross County F.C. players
Scottish Football League players
Kilsyth Rangers F.C. players
Blantyre Victoria F.C. players
Highland Football League players
Scottish Junior Football Association players
Scotland junior international footballers